Julie Crochetière (born July 10, 1980) is a Canadian singer, songwriter, and pianist.

Career
Crochetière began playing piano at the age of six and continued her studies for another eight years. When she was thirteen she wrote her first song. In high school she began developing her singing voice, then studied music for two years at Collège Lionel-Groulx.

In 2000, Crochetière joined the Popstars television series where she became a member of the band Sugar Jones. The band did two national tours and released the album Sugar Jones which was certified platinum in Canada and contained the top ten hits first "How Much Longer" and "Days Like That". Sugar Jones disbanded in 2002.

In 2003 Crochetière independently released Café, her first EP. She then performed at Beaches International Jazz Festival in Toronto, Ottawa Jazz Festival, Montreal International Jazz Festival, Canadian Music Week, and the North by Northeast festival.

Crochetière and drummer Tony Albino co-produced her debut album A Better Place (2008). The single "Precious Love" reached No. 18 on the Canadian record chart and was nominated for Best Adult Contemporary Song at the 2009 Canadian Radio Music Awards. The album was the eighth most downloaded album on the R&B chart at iTunes Canada. Crochetière was also nominated Best Female Vocalist at the 2009 Canadian Smooth Jazz Awards.

She performed at the Canadian Songwriters Hall of Fame press conference in 2008. In March 2008, she started her Play it Forward concert series which gives kids a chance to perform on stage with her and her band. In August 2010, she released the first single from her second solo album Tomorrow and a remix package which included a dubstep remix by Alister Johnson, a club mix by Ian Campbell, a radio edit, and a reggae version which was recorded at Tuff Gong Studio in Kingston, Jamaica. In March 2011, she released Steady Ground (Fontana North/Indie Soul), her second solo album.

Discography
Solo
 Cafe (self-released, 2003)
 A Better Place (Avalon/Somerset, 2008)
 Steady Ground
 Counting Dreams

As a member of Sugar Jones
 Sugar Jones (Universal, 2002)

References

External links
 Official website

1980 births
Canadian contemporary R&B singers
Canadian women jazz singers
Canadian jazz pianists
Canadian singer-songwriters
Canadian soul singers
Living people
Singers from Montreal
Songwriters from Quebec
21st-century Canadian women singers
21st-century Canadian pianists
21st-century women pianists